Mohingson Creek is a tributary of Matawan Creek in Monmouth County, New Jersey in the United States.

Originating in the Mount Pleasant Hills, Mohingson Creek flows north through Holmdel and Aberdeen Townships into Matawan Creek. The name is sometimes shortened to Whingson or Winkson.

See also
List of rivers of New Jersey

Rivers of Monmouth County, New Jersey
Holmdel Township, New Jersey
Rivers of New Jersey